The Bathiatae (alternatively, Batioi or Bathiatai) were an Illyrian people who possibly lived in modern Bosnia along the Bosna river.

They are mentioned by Appian in which he states "Octavian overcame the Oxyaei, the Perthoneatae, the Bathiatae, the Taulantii, the Cambaei, the Cinambri, the Meromenni, and the Pyrissaei, the Docleatae, the Carui, the Interphrurini, the Naresii, the Glintidiones, the Taurisci, the Hippasini and the Bessi".

They were located among today's modern Bosna River which was once known as Bathinus flumen and they took their name from this river.

See also 
Bato (Illyrian name)

References 

Illyrian tribes
Ancient tribes in Bosnia and Herzegovina